George Henry Lang (20 November 1874 – 20 October 1958) was an English Bible teacher, author, and biblical scholar.

Of his Christian contemporaries, Lang was influenced by the writings of G.H. Pember, C.H. Spurgeon, Arthur Tappan Pierson, and George Müller.

Life and Belief
Lang was born in Greenwich, England. His mother died shortly after Lang's birth, and he was raised under the influence of his Christian father. Lang made a profession of the Christian faith and dedicated his life to Jesus Christ at 7 years old. His family belonged to the Exclusive Brethren; but later in life, he affiliated himself with the Open Brethren.

Lang held the belief that the only qualification for a believer was having made a sincere profession of faith. For this one belief, Lang is considered by some Plymouth Brethren as the most controversial figure since Darby regarding the administration of the Church affairs. Later in Lang's life and teachings, he challenged Darby's "federation view" of the church and stressed the local fellowship's autonomy and independence.

Ministry and Work
Lang upheld a principle that he "did not look to man for the means of his subsistence, but only to God", and Lang's faith grew with its exercise. In Lang's words,"Praying is working, and not merely an adjunct to working. It is a form of working, and not simply a somewhat properly added to our efforts out of reverence to the Almighty; nor is it only an appeal for His blessing to prosper our labours.  When a righteous man prays he works.  For prayer in the spirit is one agency by which the Spirit of God effects through the believer His will, and is, indeed, a putting forth of His energy."

Lang was a very close student of the Holy Scriptures and an independent thinker. He was not prepared to take traditional interpretations unless he was personally convinced that they were right. Lang was also an active Gospel preacher and from time to time he was found in countries from the Arabian deserts to the Russian steppes preaching. Lang almost traveled and preached in the entire world in his missionary career.

Lang once said,  "No man should write a book until he is 40. He needs to prove his theories in practice before publishing." Most of Lang's books were published after he was 50 years old.

Death
Lang died at age 83, in Wimborne, Dorset, England.

Books
Lang's writings include fourteen major books and many other booklets. Some of his works are noted below.
Anthony Norris Groves - Biography of A.N. Groves
Praying is Working
Atoning Blood
The Unequal Yoke
Firstfruits and Harvest
Firstborn Sons -Their Rights and Risk
The New Birth
The Clean Heart
Balanced Christianity
Coming Events, An Outline of Bible Prophecy
The Earlier Years of the Modern Tongues Movement
Departure - An Appeal Addressed by one of Themselves Mainly to Christians Known as Open Brethren
Divine Guidance - Its Reality, Methods, Conditions
The First Resurrection
God's Plan - Christ's Suffering and the Spirit's Power
The History and Diaries of an Indian Christian - J.C. Aroolappen
The Local Assembly
The Histories and Prophecies of Daniel
The Epistle to the Hebrews
The Revelation of Jesus Christ
An Ordered Life - The Autobiography of G.H. Lang

Translations
Translated by Lang from the German language of Erich Sauer:
 The Dawn of World Redemption
 The Triumph of the Crucified
 From Eternity to Eternity
 In the Arena of Faith

See also

Robert Govett
Watchman Nee
John Nelson Darby
Plymouth Brethren
Local Churches

References

External links
 Concerning the Ground of the Church Bible expositors,  those who over the past century and a half, have seen the ground of the church
 Schoettle Publishing Company  - Books by G. H. Lang

1874 births
1958 deaths
English evangelicals
British Plymouth Brethren
British Christian theologians